Aktas or Aqtas (Aqtas) is a village in Almaty Region of south-eastern Kazakhstan.

Populated places in Almaty Region